Frederick Smith (1901 – after 1926) was an English professional footballer who played as a centre forward. After starting his career with his hometown club Blackburn Rovers, he joined Nelson in 1924 and went on to make two appearances in the Football League Third Division North over the following two seasons. After leaving Nelson in 1926, Smith moved into non-League football with Fleetwood Town, Darwen, and as an amateur with William Dickinson & Son of Blackburn.

References

1901 births
Year of death missing
Footballers from Blackburn
English footballers
Association football forwards
Blackburn Rovers F.C. players
Nelson F.C. players
Fleetwood Town F.C. players
Darwen F.C. players
English Football League players